Jo Bergsvand (born 25 October 1960) is a Norwegian footballer. He played in one match for the Norway national football team in 1983.

References

External links
 
 

1960 births
Living people
Norwegian footballers
Norway international footballers
Footballers from Oslo
Association football midfielders
Vålerenga Fotball players